In enzymology, a 3-β(or 20-α)-hydroxysteroid dehydrogenase is an enzyme that catalyzes the chemical reaction

5α-androstan-3β,17β-diol + NADP+  17β-hydroxy-5α-androstan-3-one + NADPH + H+

This enzyme possesses the combined activities of the 3-β-hydroxysteroid dehydrogenase/Δ-5-4 isomerase and 20-α-hydroxysteroid dehydrogenase enzymes.

References

EC 1.1.1
NADPH-dependent enzymes
Enzymes of unknown structure